Emma Charlotte Richards MBE (born in 1975) is a British yachtswoman. In 2002–2003, she became the first British woman and youngest person to complete the Around Alone, a 29,000 mile, single-handed round the world yacht race with stops. She was a crew member during the Volvo Ocean Race 2001–2002 on AMER SPORTS TOO.

Her talent comes from spending so much time sailing, from a young age. At 11 she competed in dinghy world championships. She took a degree in sports medicine at the University of Glasgow. She was awarded an MBE in the New Years Honours List 2004, in recognition of her remarkable achievements.

References

External links
Solo Navigator website

Living people
Alumni of the University of Glasgow
English female sailors (sport)
Single-handed circumnavigating sailors
Members of the Order of the British Empire
English explorers
Female explorers
Volvo Ocean Race sailors
1975 births